The Telemax is a telecommunications tower built from 1988 to 1992 in Hanover. The tower is the fifth-tallest telecommunications tower in Germany. The owner and operator of the site is  a subsidiary of Deutsche Telekom.

Description
Originally a substantially slimmer round tower was planned. However, when the plans were submitted for approval, the inscription Model Hamburg was allegedly still written on the plan. It was decided that only a Model Hanover was appropriate for the state capital and thus the planning of the telecommunication tower had to begin again.

There is no observation deck on the Telemax. The building is of architectural interest due to its square surfaces. In 1997, Boeckler received cement-steel prize  for the tower's truss structure.

It can be seen from all over this part of the city, and is an obvious landmark. The name of the previous radio tower in the city was changed to  after this new tower went into service. The tower is illuminated in magenta, the corporate color of Deutsche Telekom AG, for special occasions, such as the Hannover Messe or CeBit.

See also
List of towers
List of masts

References

External links

Towers completed in 1992
Communication towers in Germany
Buildings and structures in Hanover
1992 establishments in Germany